Xiao Tabuyan (died after 1150) was empress of the Western Liao dynasty (Qara Khitai) by marriage to her cousin Yelü Dashi (Emperor Dezong). She was known in Muslim sources as Kuyang or Orghina. She served as the regent of the empire for her son, Yelü Yilie (Emperor Renzong), from 1143 to 1150 during his minority.

Life 
After Yelü Dashi's death in 1143, she assumed the throne as regent for their little son Yelü Yilie. She also changed era date to Xianqing and started to rule effectively.

In March 1144, Oghuz tribes reinvaded Bukhara and held it probably until 1148. Later that year, Emperor Xizong of Jin sent a messenger named Zhangge Hannu (粘割韓奴) to Tabuyan, who only arrived in Qara Khitai lands in 1146, demanding her submission to Jin. Furious, Tabuyan executed him immediately. 

She stepped down in 1150, when Yelü Yilie came of age.

Family 
Spouse: Yelü Dashi (cousin)

Children: 
 Yelü Yilie (son)
 Yelü Pusuwan (daughter)

References 

|-

12th-century viceregal rulers
12th-century women rulers
Qara Khitai empresses
12th-century Khitan women
Xiao clan